Jumper is a 2008 American science fiction action film loosely based on Steven Gould's 1993 novel of the same name. Directed by Doug Liman, the film stars Hayden Christensen as a young man capable of teleporting, as he is chased by a secret society intent on killing him. Jamie Bell, Rachel Bilson, Max Thieriot, AnnaSophia Robb, Diane Lane, Michael Rooker, and Samuel L. Jackson also star.

The script went through a rewrite prior to filming, and the roles for the main characters were changed during production. Filmed in 20 cities and 14 countries from 2007 to 2008 and released on February 14, 2008, the film grossed $225 million worldwide and received generally negative reviews from critics, mostly because of the many changes to Gould's novel, rushed plot, and anticlimactic ending.

Plot 
When David Rice (Thieriot) was 15-years-old in high school he discovers his ability to teleport, or “jump”, after he falls through thin ice on the Huron River. He uses the ability to escape the abusive household of his father and moves to New York where he robs banks by teleporting into their vaults after hours. Eight years later David (Christiansen) lives a life of leisure in a luxury penthouse apartment, spending his days jumping around the world to various exotic sites including surfing in Tahiti, lunching on top of the Sphinx’s head, and picking up a woman in a London pub.

One day he’s confronted by Roland (Jackson), a leader of the Paladins who hunt and kill Jumpers, believing their gifts make them abominations. Roland attacks David with specialized weapons meant to disrupt a Jumper’s abilities to teleport away, but David manages to escape back to his home in Ann Arbor. There, he reconnects with his high school crush Millie (Bilson) where she tends bar and also runs into his former high school bully Mark (Dunn). David and Mark fight and David jumps him into one of the bank vaults he robbed years earlier.

Meanwhile David charms Millie into joining him on a spontaneous vacation to Rome. David trespasses at the Colosseum when they are turned away from the gates by the guards, and while Millie is still outside the gate he is attacked by a team of Paladins. Griffin (Bell) arrives after following David since they ran into each other in London, he kills the Paladins, quickly explains who and what they are to David and then leaves. David accidentally chases Griffin through his “jump scar” the event horizon created where the jumper creates the wormhole they pass through, and he ends up at Griffins lair in the middle of a desert. He quickly returns to Rome where he’s arrested for trespassing and taken into custody. After eight hours of interrogation, David’s mother Mary (Lane) suddenly appears and leaves him keys to escape his handcuffs before the Paladins arrive to kill him. He quickly escapes, escorts Millie from the police station to the airport where he puts her on a flight back to America and then returns to Griffin’s lair.

David follows Griffin to Tokyo where he follows him until he’s able to convince Griffin to partner together in an effort to kill Roland and save Millie. They jump to the airport where Millie was due to arrive, hoping to intercept her before she leaves but they are too late and she has gone home. David jumps to her apartment and demonstrates his powers to her in a quick explanation before the Paladins show up and attack the apartment. David quickly jumps her away to Griffin’s lair, enraging Griffin as he explains to David that the Paladins possess the technology to keep a jumper’s jump scar open and pass through it themselves. Roland and his team then suddenly jump through the scar and into Griffin’s lair where they fight the two jumpers. Roland pins David with electrical webbing to the wall and nearly kills him before Griffin blasts a flamethrower at him and his team, killing one of the other Paladins. 

Griffin manages to jump to Millie’s apartment and retrieve the machine that keeps the scar open, bringing it back with them. However, before the scar closes a Paladin cable fires through the scar and grabs Millie, pulling her through the scar and back into her apartment. David wants to rescue her while Griffin refuses to help saying losing friends and family to the Paladins is simply a part of Jumper life. Griffin then preps a bomb he has stored in his lair to deliver to Millie’s apartment and hopefully kill Roland and the rest of his team.

David, not wanting to endanger Millie, steals the bomb and Griffin pursues. The two engage in a lengthy battle through multiple jump sites on top of mountains, at landmarks, and finally at a Chechen battlefield where David manages to trap Griffin in tangled high-tension wires. He then returns to Millie’s apartment to confront the Paladins who immediately trap him in their high voltage cabling. Wanting to rescue Millie, he attempts to jump her entire apartment, a feat no Jumper had succeeded at until that point. David jumps the apartment with Millie and the Paladins into the Huron River where he fell through the ice as a teenager. He then jumps himself, Millie, and Roland to the library, though the successive jumps render him unconscious. Millie revives him and he jumps Roland to an isolated cave above the Colorado River in the Grand Canyon, reminding Roland that he’s different from the other jumpers because he didn’t kill Roland when he had the opportunity.

Later, David tracks down his mother, who is also a Paladin and has worked from the inside of the organization to protect David by hiding information about him from her colleagues. He accepts that they are on opposite sides, and bids farewell to his mother on good terms, then jumps away with Millie to a warmer destination.

Cast

 Hayden Christensen as David Rice, a young man who discovers the genetic spatial ability to "jump" over short and long distances enshrouded by thin, black smoke. He also is a latent telekinetic, an additional hereditary ability that activates whenever he is stressed and cannot jump.
 Max Thieriot as 15-year-old David Rice
 Ryan Grantham as 5-year-old David Rice
 Rachel Bilson as Millie Harris, David's love interest.
 AnnaSophia Robb as Young Millie Harris
 Samuel L. Jackson as Roland Cox, the current leader of the Paladins group.
 Jamie Bell as Griffin O'Connor, a renegade Jumper.
 Diane Lane as Mary Rice, David's long-lost mother.
 Teddy Dunn as Mark Kobold, David's childhood bully.
 Jesse James as Young Mark Kobold
 Michael Rooker as William Rice, David's abusive father.
 Kristen Stewart as Sophie, David's younger half-sister.
 Tom Hulce as Mr. Bowker
 Barbara Garrick as Ellen

Production

Script and storyboards
In November 2005, New Regency Productions hired director Doug Liman to helm the film adaptation of the science fiction novel Jumper by Steven Gould. Screenwriter Jim Uhls was hired to rewrite an adapted screenplay by David S. Goyer. However, Liman desired another rewrite and Simon Kinberg assisted in completing the script. Liman said about using the novel for developing the script: "This is 100% Steven Gould's story, it's just reinvented as a movie." In an interview, Gould revealed that he approved of the deviations from the novel. Before filming was to begin, the studio announced plans to develop a trilogy based on the novel's premise.

While other films tend to use only one storyboard artist, Jumper required six, who each worked on an individual action sequence. The artists were given specific instruction on the rules of the teleportation used in the film, to ensure accuracy in the storyboarding. One of them, Rob McCallum, reflected on the instructions: "I was just thinking, 'How would a guy that can teleport fight?' So you were really pushing yourself to try to think of inventive, cool, spectacular ways that you could use this jumping talent that these characters have."

Casting
In April 2006, actors Tom Sturridge, Teresa Palmer, and Jamie Bell were cast for Jumper with Sturridge in the lead role. The following July, actor Samuel L. Jackson was cast as Roland Cox, with producer Simon Kinberg rewriting the original screenplay draft by Goyer. Principal photography was scheduled to take place in Tokyo, Rome, Toronto, and New York. Production was stopped in June 2006 after producer Tom Rothman told Liman "The lead is 18. Wouldn't the movie be better if he was 25? You have a huge movie here and adults won't go and see an 18-year-old. They'll consider it a children's movie. You could make a bigger movie than that." Liman agreed on casting older actors for furthering the romantic aspect of the film. In August, actor Hayden Christensen replaced Sturridge in the lead role as David just two weeks before the beginning of shooting, as the studio "became concerned about not having a more prominent actor in their trio of young stars." After Christensen was recast for the lead role, Liman replaced Palmer with Rachel Bilson.

Filming

In September 2006, Jumper was filmed at various locations in Peterborough, Ontario and principal photography began in Toronto in October. In December 2006, Liman negotiated with the Rome Film Commission for rare access to film for three days in the Colosseum. The scene in the Colosseum was originally written for the Pantheon, where exterior shots were also filmed. The crew was required to keep equipment off the ground by using harnesses and had to rely on natural light for filming. Filming took place for 45 minutes in the morning and in the evening so as not to disturb the public touring the amphitheater throughout the day. In order to maximize the short period for filming, four steadicams were set up to ensure time was not wasted in reloading the camera. A visual effects supervisor explained how visual effects were needed for various aspects after filming: "There were three kinds of shots: there were shots where they were able to get most of what they needed in the Collosseum itself; and then there were shots on a set that needed extensions beyond the limits of the set; and then there were shots where we needed to create the Coliseum basically from scratch." After filming in Rome, scenes were filmed in Toronto during December 2006 to January 2007 and wrapped at the Canadian location on January 19.

On January 26 in Toronto, 56-year-old David Ritchie, a set dresser, was fatally struck by frozen debris while dismantling an outdoor set in wintry conditions. Another worker was injured and was sent to a hospital with serious head and shoulder injuries. After Toronto, the cast and crew traveled to Tokyo to film scenes. One scene required over 30 shoots as the scene could only be filmed in between traffic light changes. As a result of director Liman insisting Christensen perform his own stunts, the actor injured his hand, split open his ear, and developed a hyperdilated pupil that required hospital care while filming various scenes. In February 2007, the next filming site was set up at Gallup Park in Ann Arbor, Michigan. Sixty students from the nearby Huron High School were cast as extras for the film. Since additional filming was required of the area, twenty other students were used for a day of filming in September. Altogether, filming took place in 20 cities in 14 countries.

Visual effects
The New Zealand visual effects studio Weta Digital was initially selected to assist in creating a preview clip for the 2007 Comic-Con Convention. The studio's 100 employees later developed the visual effects for 300 of the 600 shots in the film. In total, there are more than 100 jumps in the film, and each jump was modified based on the distance and location the character(s) jumped. The jumps were developed using Nuke and Shake software; many, including those to Big Ben and the Sphinx were created with Maya. Weta's VFX supervisor Erik Winquist explained how the visual effects of the jumps were created: "The concept of what a jump looks like changed and evolved a little over the course of post production. There are shots in the film that use still array footage but not in the same way that we saw in The Matrix. The Matrix was largely about stopping time whereas this was about using slow shutter speeds on those still array cameras to end up with a streaky motion-blurred image as the perspective was changing, which is a pretty interesting look." Other visual effects studios that assisted with the film include Hydraulx, Digital Domain, and Pixel Magic. Lightwave 3D was also used for some of the movie's scenes.

Reception

Critical response
On Rotten Tomatoes, the film has an approval rating of 15% based on 171 reviews, with an average rating of 4.00/10. The site's critics consensus reads, "Featuring uninvolving characters and loose narrative, Jumper is an erratic action pic with little coherence and lackluster special effects." Metacritic gives the film an average score of 35 out of 100, based on 36 critics, indicating "generally unfavorable reviews". Audiences polled by CinemaScore gave the film an average grade of "B" on an A+ to F scale.

Austin Chronicles Marc Salov called the film "... pretty slick, entertaining stuff, well-crafted by Liman, edited into a tight, action-packed bundle of nerviness". Empire had a verdict of "[Doug] Liman's least charismatic action movie and the least developed, but it still packs some cracking action into its brief running time and lays foundations on which a great franchise could be built". Australian film reviewer David Stratton stated that "this film represents a new [watershed] in the history of the cinema because it's got no plot, it's got no characters, it's got no action scene that makes any kind of sense", and awarded it half a star out of five.

Box office
The film was released on February 14, 2008 in the United States and Canada, in the hopes of pulling in business on Valentine's Day. The film was targeted at an audience of both males and females below the age of 25. Jumper grossed $27.3 million on 4,600 screens in 3,428 theaters from Friday to Sunday, ranking first for the weekend at the box office. In its first weekend, the film set the record for the largest February release in Korea and had the first place position in 11 of the 30 markets it was released in. For the first two weekends of its release, the film maintained its number one position in international markets, while slipping to the second position in the United States to the release of Vantage Point. The film's worldwide gross is $221,231,186 with $80,172,128 from the box office in the United States and Canada and $142,059,058 from other territories. It was the 28th highest-grossing film worldwide for 2008.

Soundtrack

The score for the film was released on February 19, 2008, after the film's release in theaters. The tracks were all written by John Powell. The music was conducted by Brett Weymark and performed by the Sydney Symphony Orchestra.

Home media
The film was released on DVD and Blu-ray Disc in North America on June 10, 2008 and internationally on June 16. Special features include a commentary, deleted scenes, an animated graphic novel, featurettes, and a digital copy allowing consumers to watch the film on portable devices.

Video game
A video game titled Jumper: Griffin's Story was made for the Xbox 360, PlayStation 2, and Wii consoles. The storyline focuses on the character Griffin as he attempts to avenge the death of his parents. Nicholas Longano of the video game publisher Brash Entertainment stated, "From the very first script read, we knew this had to be made into a game. The teleportation elements make for some very compelling gameplay." The game was released on February 12, 2008, two days before the film's wide release. GameRankings gave the Xbox 360 version of the game a 28% positive rating, based on 12 reviews. The PlayStation 2 version received a 35% positive rating while the Wii version had a 23% positive rating. Daemon Hatfield of IGN reviewed the Xbox 360 version and gave it a negative review: "Low production values, monotonous gameplay, and lackluster visuals make this a story you can jump past."

Novel tie-ins
Steven Gould, the author of Jumper and Reflex also wrote Jumper: Griffin's Story as a tie-in for the film. The novel, released on August 21, 2007, focuses on the character Griffin which was created by screenwriter David S. Goyer specifically for the film. Because Griffin had not appeared in the two prior novels, Gould developed Jumper: Griffin's Story as a backstory of the character's early childhood before the film. When writing the novel, Gould had to work closely with a producer of the film to ensure that the story did not conflict with the film's premise.

Oni Press released a graphic novel, Jumper: Jumpscars, that portrays several backstories related to the film. The novel was released on February 13, 2008, one day before the film's wide release. A publisher for Oni Press commented on the tie-in to the film, stating: "The world that was being built around these characters was so well-realized and the mythology so interesting that other stories about this conflict would be plentiful and add to what the filmmakers were building." The novel was written by Nunzio DeFilippis and Christina Weir and illustrated by Brian Hurtt.

In November 2016, the re-illustrated covers of the Skulduggery Pleasant novel series by Derek Landy, done by Tom Percival to commend the series' 10th anniversary, had its characters modelled off of real-life celebrity figures, with "the last teleporter" Fletcher Renn on the cover of The Faceless Ones visually based on promotional stills of Hayden Christensen as David Rice from Jumper.

Potential sequel
Author Steven Gould's second novel in the Jumper series, Reflex, was published in 2004 (by 2014, two more Gould novels in the series have been published).

Prior to the film's 2008 release, Hayden Christensen reflected on the possibility of one or more sequels: "This has definitely been set up in a way that will allow for more films, and Doug has been careful to make sure that he's created characters that will have room to grow." Lucas Foster during production of the film stated in an interview: "The ideas got so large, that they really couldn't fit into, you know, one or two movies, they needed to evolve over at least three movies. So we planned the story out over three movies and then we sliced it up in such a way as to leave room for the other two movies."

In response to the film's box office performance, director Doug Liman has spoken of his ideas for a sequel. Among them are that Jumpers can reach other planets and travel in time, as well as their capacity for espionage. He has also stated that Rachel Bilson's character would learn how to jump (hinted by David falling unconscious before the jump from the river to the library), just as in Gould's sequel, Reflex. However, no further updates were given for a sequel.

Television series

A spin-off television series from the film, titled Impulse, was released on YouTube Premium on June 6, 2018.

References

External links

 
 
 
 
 
 

Jumper (novel)
2008 films
2008 science fiction action films
2000s science fiction adventure films
American science fiction action films
2000s English-language films
Films directed by Doug Liman
Faster-than-light travel in fiction
Films about secret societies
Films based on American novels
Films based on science fiction novels
Films set in Michigan
Films set in Rome
Films set in New York City
Films set in Egypt
Films set in Hong Kong
Films shot in the Czech Republic
Films shot in Rome
Films shot in Egypt
Films shot in Michigan
Films shot in Tokyo
Films shot in Toronto
American science fiction adventure films
Teleportation in films
Films about wormholes
20th Century Fox films
Films with screenplays by David S. Goyer
Films with screenplays by Jim Uhls
Films with screenplays by Simon Kinberg
Dune Entertainment films
Films scored by John Powell
Films produced by Arnon Milchan
2000s American films